The Gibson Goddess is a 1909 short comedy film directed by D. W. Griffith. It stars Marion Leonard.

Cast
Marion Leonard - Nanette Ranfrea
Kate Bruce - On Sidewalk
Arthur V. Johnson - An Admirer
James Kirkwood - Admirer
George Nichols - Manager of Beach House
Anthony O'Sullivan - Commodore Fitzmaurice
Mary Pickford - On Sidewalk
Billy Quirk - An Admirer
Gertrude Robinson - On Sidewalk
Mack Sennett - An Admirer
J. Waltham - An Admirer
Dorothy West - A Maid

Synopsis
“Oh! Why do they call me the Gibson Girl?” These lines of a popular song were uttered with a sigh by the heroine of this Biograph comedy, for beauty is sometimes an annoying possession. Nanette Renfrae, after an arduous season of society’s whirl, decides to spend a quiet Summer at a secluded seaside resort. Te place selected is one frequented by the middle class, where she feels she will he free from the tormenting attentions of the male sex that her beauty has induced in the past. She arrives without ostentation accompanied only by her maid, but her extreme pulchritude and graceful bearing soon enraptured the male contingent of the place to the jealous rage of the other women folks who find themselves deserted. She cannot stir but what there is a score of admirers present. A walk on the beach, a stroll through the park is invariably attended by a regiment of gallants, until to her they become positive pests, is destined to pass time in the seclusion of her room. The maid, however, is ingenious and suggests a, new way to get rid of the troublesome pests. She attires her mistress in a bathing suit and puts on her a hideous pair of stockings line with raw cotton, which gives her a Gargantuan appearance, at least as to her nethers. Of course, the persistent tormenters flee in a panic when they behold; but, you know “one but the brave deserve the fair,” and Commodore Fitzmorris sticks, thereby making a decided impression upon Nanette. You may imagine the chagrin of the others when they learn of the hoax. Fitzie is now the favoured one. As for the others, they are a disgruntled bunch, for the other girls, slighted before, turn cold shoulders on them.

See also
Mary Pickford filmography

References

External links
 The Gibson Goddess @ IMDb.com

The Gibson Goddess available for free download at Internet Archive

1909 films
American silent short films
Biograph Company films
Films directed by D. W. Griffith
Silent American comedy films
1909 comedy films
American black-and-white films
Articles containing video clips
1909 short films
American comedy short films
1900s American films